Constitution Day, also known as "National Law Day" , is celebrated in India on 26 November every year to commemorate the adoption of the Constitution of India. On 26 November 1949, the Constituent Assembly of India adopted to the Constitution of India, and it came into effect on 26 January 1950.

The Government of India declared 26 November as Constitution Day on 19 November 2015 by a gazette notification. The Prime Minister of India Narendra Modi made the declaration on 11 October 2015 while laying the foundation stone of the B. R. Ambedkar's Statue of Equality memorial in Mumbai. The year of 2021 was the 131st birth anniversary of Ambedkar, who had chaired the drafting committee of the Constituent Assembly and played a pivotal role in the drafting of the constitution. Previously this day was celebrated as Law Day.
26 November was chosen to spread the importance of the constitution and to spread thoughts and ideas of Ambedkar. PM Modi Speech On National Law Day 2021, 26 November, and also The President , Vice President and Lok Sabha Speaker also addressed the program.

Background
Since 2015 was the 125th birth anniversary year of B. R. Ambedkar (14 April 1891 – 6 December 1956), who is known as the father of the Indian constitution, the government decided in May 2015 to celebrate this year "in a big way". A special committee chaired by Prime Minister of India was announced for year-long celebrations. Various programmes will be held by various ministries and departments throughout the year to spread thoughts and ideas of Ambedkar. As part of the celebrations while laying foundation stone for an Ambedkar memorial at the Indu Mills compounds in Mumbai in October 2015, the Prime Minister of India Narendra Modi announced that 26 November will be celebrated as "Constitution Day". In November 2015, the government officially announced celebration of the day.

Celebrations
Constitution Day is not a public holiday. Various departments of the Government of India celebrated the first Constitution day. As per the Department of Education and Literacy, the preamble of the constitution was read in all schools by all students. In addition, there were quiz and essay competitions both online and offline on the subject of the constitution of India. There was a lecture on salient features of the constitution in each school. The Department of Higher Education requested various universities to arrange mock parliamentary debates in colleges, and the University Grants Commission (UGC) arranged an all-India quiz competition at Ambedkar University, Lucknow, where quiz winners of all states participated.

The Ministry of External Affairs directed all overseas Indian schools to celebrate 26 November as Constitution Day and directed embassies to translate the constitution into the local language of that nation and distribute it to various academies, libraries and faculties of Indology. The work of translating the Indian constitution into Arabic has been completed. Department of Sport arranged symbolic run named "Run for Equality". There was also a special session of Indian parliament on 26 November 2015 to give tribute to the constitution and Ambedkar. The Parliament House complex was also illuminated on this occasion.

Students of Andhra University participated in the 'Run for Ambedkar' rally to mark the occasion of the 70th Constitution Day, on Beach Road in Visakhapatnam on 27 November 2019.

See also
 Republic Day (India)
 Constitution Day – other countries' celebrations

References

Observances in India
November observances
Memorials to B. R. Ambedkar
Constitution of India